× Pachyveria glauca 'Little Jewel' succulent plants are hybrids in the nothogenus × Pachyveria (Pachyphytum and Echeveria). It is a versatile plant, thriving in the (frost free) garden and in containers.

Description
This plant has cylindrical tapered leaves, shading from powdery blue with a of purple at the bottom of the plant to a light green at the points of the top leaves. That color slowly darkens down the length of the plant. Leaves resemble gems-jewels.

Cultivation
This plant propagates itself by dropping leaves, which then sprout new plants, and also by stem cuttings.

Habitat
× Pachyveria plants do best in desert and arid climates, and grow well in porous, well-drained soil. They grow well in full sun, though prefer a bit of shade in more sizzling heat of 92 and higher degrees Fahrenheit (33 degrees Celsius). They are drought and heat wave-tolerant, but love plentiful summertime water, and hardy to around 30-35 degrees Fahrenheit (-1 to 1 degrees Celsius).

See also
Echeveria elegans
Echeveria derenbergii

References

Crassulaceae
Hybrid plants
Drought-tolerant plants